Žirje is a small village northeast of Povir in the Municipality of Sežana in the Littoral region of Slovenia.

References

External links

Žirje on Geopedia

Populated places in the Municipality of Sežana